Nelson Cândido Motta Filho (born 29 October 1944, São Paulo, Brazil) is a Brazilian journalist, ghostwriter, songwriter, writer, and record producer.

He was part of the bossa nova movement, collaborating with Edu Lobo, Dori Caymmi, Lulu Santos, Rita Lee, Djavan and others, and producer for several MPB artists, such as Elis Regina, Gal Costa, Daniela Mercury and others. He was Marisa Monte's first music producer in the late 1980s. Motta also produced early Brazilian rock shows and wrote lyrics in collaboration with rock artists, such as Lulu Santos.

He produced Riû, the third album of the Portuguese fado singer Cuca Roseta, released in 2015.

References

1944 births
Living people
Conservatism in Brazil
Brazilian male writers
Brazilian journalists
Brazilian songwriters
Brazilian record producers
Businesspeople from São Paulo
Brazilian columnists
Latin music record producers